The Big Empty is a series of four books written by J.B. Stephens.

Author 

The name "J.B. Stephens" is a pseudonym of Liz Braswell, creator of the ABC Family TV series The Nine Lives of Chloe King. She also writes under the names Tracy Lynn and Celia Thompson.

Series
 Book One: The Big Empty
 Book Two: Paradise City
 Book Three: Desolation Angels
 Book Four: No Exit

References 

American young adult novels
Razorbill books